Allied Irish Bank (GB) is a bank operating in the United Kingdom as a subsidiary of Allied Irish Banks (legally registered in the UK as AIB Group (UK) plc).

History
The Allied Irish Bank can trace its history back to the year of 1825. It was located in London.

Information
The Allied Irish Bank now operates across Great Britain in 21 various locations. The bank also employs about 700 people.

Services
Allied Irish Bank (GB) offers a full range of business banking services, delivered online and through 21 branches in Great Britain. The bank is authorised by the Prudential Regulation Authority and regulated by both the Financial Conduct Authority and the Prudential Regulation Authority. It is covered by the Financial Services Compensation Scheme.

Awards
Allied Irish Bank has had the following successes and awards:
2014, 2015 and 2016 :  Best Service from a Business Bank  at Business Moneyfacts Awards
2012 and 2013 : Winner of Best Business Fixed Account provider at Business Moneyfacts Awards
2013 : Moneyfacts Awards Finalist in three categories: Business Bank of the Year
2013 :  Best Business Card Provider

See also

AIB UK

References

External links

Allied Irish Banks
Banks of the United Kingdom
1825 establishments in the United Kingdom
Banks established in 1825